Lake Chany is a lake in Novosibirsk Oblast, Russia.  

The lake extends across five districts of Novosibirsk Oblast: Zdvinsky, Barabinsky, Chanovsky, Kupinsky and Chistoozyorny.

Geography
Lake Chany is one of the largest lakes in Russia. It is located in the Baraba steppe area. The lake is shallow, hyposaline and has a fluctuating water level, which can change from season to season and year to year.
The depth of the lake is mainly 1–2 m, but it can reach 8 m in some places. Lake Chany is connected with the Small Chany (Malye Chany) and Yarkul lakes to the south. North of its northeastern end lies lake Tandovo.

Islands
There are about 70 islands on the lake: Amelkina Griva, Shuldikov, Lezhan, Medvezhy, Colpachok, Chinyaikha, Cheryomukhovy, Uzkoredky, Cheryomushkin, Kobyly, Perekopny, Bekarev, Kalinova, Shipyagin, Krugly, Kolotov, Kamyshny etc.

Climate
Severe storms are frequent on Chany, during a powerful wind, high waves occur on the surface of the lake.

Flora and fauna
A variety of ecosystems that surround the lake include a mixture of wetlands, salt marshes, and a mixture of birch and aspen forests. Lake Chany in particular is critically important for the migratory birds of Siberia, and is listed as a Ramsar Site of International Importance.

Folklore
According to local legend, a giant creature which devours cattle and people lives in the lake.

See also
 List of lakes of Russia

References

External links

Kipriyanova L.M., Yermolaeva N.I., Bezmaternykh D.M., Dvurechenskaya S.Ya., Mitrophanova E.Yu. Changes in the biota of Chany Lake along a salinity gradient // Hydrobiologia. – 2007. – V. 576, №1. – P. 83-93.

 
Chany, Lake
Ramsar sites in Russia
Protected areas of Siberia
Endorheic basins of Asia